South Fambridge is a village in Essex, England. It is located about 300 yards (0.17 miles) from the River Crouch. The village lies within the Rochford district and the parliamentary constituency of Rayleigh. Surrounded by farmland, it is reached by the Fambridge Road, approximately 1.5 miles from the main Ashingdon Road.

Airfield

The village once had a small airfield which no longer exists, having been converted into a residential estate named Pemberton Field after Noel Pemberton Billing. On 20 February 2009 it was the 100th anniversary of the first experimental flights beside the River Crouch meadows. Kenneth Bannerman, Director General of the Airfields of Britain Conservation Trust unveiled a memorial to the airfield. A Spitfire flown by Carolyn Grace took part in the Anniversary Commemoration, entertaining the crowd by carrying out some aerobatic manoeuvres.

External links
Essex Walks - South Fambridge

Villages in Essex
Rochford District